Cracker Lake is located in Glacier National Park, in the U. S. state of Montana. Located at the head of a canyon, the waters of Cracker Lake are an opaque turquoise from rock flour (silt) originating from Siyeh Glacier. Cracker Peak to the southeast and Allen Mountain to the north are other prominent peaks nearby. Cracker Lake is a  hike from the Many Glacier Hotel.

Gallery

See also
List of lakes in Glacier County, Montana

References

Lakes of Glacier National Park (U.S.)
Lakes of Glacier County, Montana